Professor Simon Ho Shun-man, well-known expert on corporate governance, is the current President of the Hang Seng University of Hong Kong. Under his presidency, Hang Seng Management College gained university title as the Hang Seng University of Hong Kong on 30 October 2018, becoming the second private university in Hong Kong.

Professor Ho was born in Hong Kong. He attended Buddhist Tai Hung College. After graduating from Secondary School, he obtained a BA degree (Management and Psychology) from the University of Washington (USA) in 1979. After two years, he obtained a MSc degree (with Distinction) in Information Systems from the London School of Economics (UK). He obtaineda PhD degree in Accounting and Finance from the University of Bradford (UK) in 1988. He holds a Certificate in Higher Education Management and Leadership from the University of California, Berkeley (USA). He was a Commonwealth Scholar and is a certified public accountant in the UK, Australia and Canada.

Introduction 
1982 Ho joined CUHK.

1995-2002 Director of the School of Accountancy, CUHK.

1996 Ho initiated and established the “Dragon League”, an academic alliance among the 4 accounting schools of CUHK, Peking University, Fudan University and National Taiwan University.

1998 Co-founded the Master in Professional Accountancy Programme jointly organized by CUHK and the Shanghai National Institute of Accounting.

2004-2009 Dean of the School of Business & Founding Director of the Centre for Corporate Governance and Financial Policy (CCGFP), HKBU

2009-2014 Vice Rector (Academic Affairs) of the University of Macau. Prof. Ho played an important role in the many changes at UM, including the undergraduate curriculum reforms, the launch of the new general education programme, and the establishment of the first Honorary College in the region and Asia’s largest residential college system. He also led in designing all academic buildings and facilities in the new Hengqin campus.

16 March, 2014, he assumed the presidency of Hang Seng Management College.

Before joining higher education, he was an audit staff at a certified public accountants’ firm, a financial system analyst and an assistant consultant at the Hong Kong Productivity Council. .

Public service 
 Chairman, Citizen Advisory Committee on Community Relations, Independent Commission Against Corruption (2021- )
 Member, Advisory Committee on Corruption, Independent Commission Against Corruption (2021- )
 Vice Chairman, Training Committee, The Scout Association of Hong Kong (2021- )
 Founding President, Hong Kong Academic Accounting Association (1996-2003)
 Vice President, International Association for Accounting Education and Research (1997-2003)
 Member of Deposit Protection Appeals Tribunal (2005-2011) 
 Member of Securities and Futures Appeals Tribunal (2007-2011) 
Member, Advisory Group on Directors and Officers Related Provisions ("AG3") 
 Advisor, Dashun Foundation
 Advisor, Our Hong Kong Foundation

Notes

References 

Living people
Year of birth missing (living people)
Members of the Election Committee of Hong Kong, 2021–2026